Transit Future is a campaign to expand the public transit system in Chicago. The project was launched in 2014 by the Center for Neighborhood Technology and the Active Transportation Alliance.

It is modeled on a successful campaign by Los Angeles mayor Antonio Villaraigosa that built public support to raise funds for major transportation investments.  Prominent supporters of the Transit Future initiative include Rahm Emanuel, Toni Preckwinkle, Jesús "Chuy" García, and various business and civic groups.

Advocates have suggested that Cook County establish a "dedicated revenue stream" of some sort to pay for the transit improvements.  They argue that compared to peer cities, Chicago has one of the lowest rates of per capita spending on transit.

Details

Six rail extensions and several other projects are proposed, at a cost of $20 billion:

 Red Line extension to 130th Street
 Brown Line extension to Jefferson Park Transit Center
 Orange Line extension to Ford City Mall
 Blue Line extension to Oakbrook Center (Congress Branch)
 Blue Line extension to Schaumburg (O'Hare Branch)
 Yellow Line extension to Old Orchard Mall
 New Ashland Bus Rapid Transit
 New Lime Line running north-south near Cicero Avenue
 New South Lakefront Service
 New Metra SouthEast Service to Crete
 New express service running between O'Hare and Midway Airports
 Bus rapid transit lines in the suburbs
 West Loop transportation center

References

Organizations based in Chicago
2014 establishments in Illinois